The southern white-breasted hedgehog (Erinaceus concolor), sometimes referred to as white-bellied hedgehog or white-chested hedgehog, is a hedgehog native to Eastern Europe and Southwestern Asia.

Description
It is very similar in lifestyle and appearance to the European hedgehog (E. europaeus), but it has a white spot on its chest.

Taxonomy
For a long time these two species were considered to be one. The northern white-breasted hedgehog of Eastern Europe and Russia was formerly recognized as a subspecies of the southern white-breasted hedgehog but newer investigations see both as different species. The southern white-breasted hedgehog and European hedgehog can hybridize.

Behaviour
Unlike its European counterpart, the southern white-breasted hedgehog never digs dens. It prefers building grass nests in secluded places.

References

southern white-breasted hedgehog
Mammals of Europe
Mammals of Western Asia
Mammals of the Middle East
Mammals of Turkey
Least concern biota of Asia
Least concern biota of Europe
southern white-breasted hedgehog
southern white-breasted hedgehog